is a railway station in Sumiyoshi-ku, Osaka, Osaka Prefecture, Japan, operated by the private railway operator Nankai Electric Railway.

Lines
Kohama Station is served by the Nankai Main Line, and has the station number "NK07".

Layout
The station has two island platforms serving two tracks each. Tracks 2 and 4 are fenced and are not in use.

Tracks

Adjacent stations

See also
 List of railway stations in Japan

References

External links

  

Railway stations in Japan opened in 1917
Railway stations in Osaka Prefecture